3,4-Methylenedioxy-N-methoxyamphetamine (MDMEO, MDMEOA, or MDMeOA) is a lesser-known psychedelic drug and a substituted amphetamine.  It is also the N-methoxy analogue of MDA.  MDMEO was first synthesized by Alexander Shulgin. In his book PiHKAL (Phenethylamines i Have Known And Loved), the minimum dosage is listed as 180 mg. MDMEO may be found as white crystals.  It produces few to no effects.  Very little data exists about the pharmacological properties, metabolism, and toxicity of MDMEO.

Legality

United Kingdom
This substance is a Class A drug in the Drugs controlled by the UK Misuse of Drugs Act.

See also 
 Phenethylamine
 Psychedelics, dissociatives and deliriants
 Substituted methylenedioxyphenethylamines

References

External links 
 MDMEO entry in PiHKAL
 MDMEO entry in PiHKAL • info

Substituted amphetamines
Benzodioxoles